Egoleech is the third studio album by German goregrind band Cock and Ball Torture. This album shows a shift in the group's style from its trademark pornogrind sound to groove-laden death metal.

Track listing

References

External links

2004 albums
Cock and Ball Torture (band) albums